Bakhrabad Gas Field is a natural gas field located in Comilla, Bangladesh. It was discovered in 1968 by the then Pakistan Shell Oil Company, and started gas production in 1981. Wells were drilled with a depth between 1968 and 2838 meters from the surface. It is a subsidiary of Bangladesh Gas Fields Company Limited (BGFCL).

See also 

List of natural gas fields in Bangladesh
Bangladesh Gas Fields Company Limited
Gas Transmission Company Limited

References 

1968 establishments in East Pakistan
Natural gas fields in Bangladesh